Obermaiselstein is a municipality and a village in the district of Oberallgäu in the German state of Bavaria.

References

Oberallgäu